Cliff Lake is a lake in Summit County, Utah, United States, located in the Henrys Fork Basin of the Uinta Mountains near Mount Powell.

References

Lakes of Utah
Lakes of Summit County, Utah